If It's a Rose is an Australian television movie, or rather a live television comedy play, which aired in 1958 on ABC. Australian TV drama was relatively rare at the time.

Duration was 60 minutes, in black-and-white. Archival status of the program is unknown. Annette Andre was a relatively unknown 18 year old.

A version had been performed on British TV in 1954.

Plot
Set in Italy. Over the course of one day, Mario is courting Anna.

Cast
Annette Andre as Anna
Don Pascoe as Mario
Ethel Lang as the maid

Production
It was recorded live in Sydney. It was an early television performance from Annette Andre who later recalled:
Even though I had been performing on stage from a very young age... I still had to overcome the exquisite torture of stage fright when I did my first TV drama. For some reason, my radio work was anxiety-free, perhaps because my ‘audience’ was only the other actors grouped around the microphone. My If It’s a Rose co-star was as nervous as I was and in Act II started calling me ‘Annette’ instead of ‘Maria’. If that wasn’t unsettling enough, the zipper on my costume got stuck and I had to play the rest of the scene facing the camera to hide the half-open dress. My ballet training came into play here, as I’d learned to overcome problems such as falling on stage and not let them affect my performance.

See also
The Passionate Pianist  - 1957 ABC TV play
List of live television plays broadcast on Australian Broadcasting Corporation (1950s)

References

External links
If It's a Rose at IMDb

1958 television plays
1950s Australian television plays
Australian Broadcasting Corporation original programming
English-language television shows
Black-and-white Australian television shows
Australian live television shows